Otto Schulz-Kampfhenkel (27 August 1910 in Buckow – 21 August 1989) was a German geographer, explorer, writer and film producer.

Biography
At the age of 23 Schulz-Kampfhenkel made an expedition to Liberia. He described his experiences in the book Der Dschungel Rief... (The Jungle Called...). After finishing his geography studies he became the leader of the German Amazon-Jary-Expedition (1935-1937), supported by both Brazilian and German governments and the Nazi party's Foreign Organization (NSDAP/AO). Schulz-Kampfhenkel relates about this expedition in his book Rätsel der Urwaldhölle (Riddle(s) of the jungle hell) and produced an eponymous film, as well.

In 1943 Schulz-Kampfhenkel got promoted to Special Commissioner of geographical questions in the Reichsforschungsrat after he had been lieutenant of Luftwaffe and SS-Untersturmführer.

Notes

External links
 
 
 Institut für Weltkunde in Bildung und Forschung (WBF) 
 Documentation: Herrenmenschen im Regenwald 

1910 births
1989 deaths
German geographers
German film producers
German explorers
Scientists active at the Museum für Naturkunde, Berlin
Explorers of Africa
Nazi Party members
Nazis in South America
Explorers of Amazonia
Film people from Brandenburg
People from Märkisch-Oderland
20th-century geographers